The slaty-crowned antpitta (Grallaricula nana) is a species of bird placed in the family Grallariidae.

It is found in Colombia, Ecuador, Guyana, Peru, and Venezuela. Its natural habitat is subtropical or tropical moist montane forests.

References

slaty-crowned antpitta
Birds of the Colombian Andes
Birds of the Ecuadorian Andes
Birds of the Peruvian Andes
Birds of Venezuela
slaty-crowned antpitta
Taxonomy articles created by Polbot